Hypseleotris kimberleyensis, the Barnett River gudgeon, is a species of fish in the family Eleotridae endemic to Australia, where it is only known from the Barnett River system of Kimberley, Western Australia. Its preferred habitat is rocky pools and streams.

References

kimberleyensis
Freshwater fish of Western Australia
Taxonomy articles created by Polbot
Fish described in 1982